On 22 October 2015, 21-year-old Anton Lundin Pettersson attacked Kronan School in Trollhättan, Sweden, with a sword. He killed a teaching assistant and a male student, stabbed another male student and a teacher, and died later of the gunshot wounds he received during his apprehension. The second teacher who was wounded died in the hospital six weeks after the attack, on 3 December.

It was Sweden's first deadly attack on a school since the 1961 Kungälv school shooting when one person was killed and six injured. It is also the deadliest attack on a school in Swedish history. The initial police investigation concluded that Pettersson was motivated by racism and had chosen the school as his target due to its location in a neighbourhood with a high immigrant population.

Background 
The city of Trollhättan had experienced hate crimes in the past, including arson at a mosque in the 1990s. Anders Sundell has found it to be the most ethnically segregated city in Sweden.

Although surveys by non-governmental organisations have frequently shown Sweden to be the European country which is most tolerant of immigration, its population is polarised on the issue. Sundell's research showed that consistently over the last 20 years, a plurality of Swedes have wanted to limit the number of refugees coming to the country, but "There is a large difference between what the politicians think and the general public, and the media have not questioned the politicians until recently." As a consequence, Swedish anti-immigrant forces believe that there is a conspiracy opposing their views.

Attack 
Pettersson entered the school in a German World War II helmet and a mask similar to Darth Vader's in Star Wars. At first, eyewitnesses believed it was a Halloween prank. Pettersson immediately attacked 20-year-old teaching assistant Lavin Eskandar.  Eskandar, a Feyli Kurd from Iraq, was stabbed and died at the scene. Pettersson then stabbed the abdomen of Ahmed Hassan, a 15-year-old born in Somalia. Hassan died in the hospital. After that, while wandering the halls, Pettersson posed with two students who thought he was playing a prank, and took a picture of Pettersson with blood dripping from his sword. Shortly after, when 42-year-old teacher Nazir Amso asked Pettersson to remove his mask, Amso was stabbed. He died due to his injuries six weeks later at the hospital on 3 December. At 10.16 A.M., Pettersson was shot by police. He died in the hospital.

On the morning of 23 October, Swedish police and media confirmed that the attack had "racist motives" and that it was a "hate crime". Niclas Hallgren, the city's police chief, stated that all of the victims were "dark-skinned". Head of investigation Thord Haraldsson said that CCTV footage showed that Pettersson spared the lives of students with white skin.

Perpetrator 
Anton Niclas Lundin Pettersson (22 June 199422 October 2015) was identified as the attacker by Expressen. According to Aftonbladet, the perpetrator had visited right-wing extremist groups at social media sites supporting Adolf Hitler and Nazi Germany. He had also joined a group on Facebook that wants to stop immigration to Sweden. The Swedish Security Service were called in to investigate these findings. Pettersson had no criminal record and was not a member of any political organisation, but had supported a petition by the Sweden Democrats to initiate a referendum on immigration. He left a handwritten note at his home in which he declared that something had to be done about immigration, and that he did not expect to survive his spree.

Pettersson lived in an apartment in the neighbourhood of Stavre, but chose to attack the Kronan School in Kronogården, where there are more immigrants; police cited this as more evidence towards his motive. Former classmates described the perpetrator as a lonely person who "lived in his own world" and always dressed in black clothes influenced either by the emo or rock scene.

Bjørn Ihler, a survivor of Norwegian far-right extremist Anders Behring Breivik's terror attacks in 2011, wrote in The Guardian that in 2013, Pettersson had "liked" a YouTube video of former Ku Klux Klan leader Johnny Lee Clary testifying how a positive experience with a black man had caused him to disavow his previously-held beliefs.

Aftermath and reactions 
Prime Minister Stefan Löfven travelled to Trollhättan after news of the attack, calling it a "black day" for the country. Interior Minister Anders Ygeman wrote on Twitter, "It is with sadness and dismay I received the news of the attack on the school in Trollhättan. My thoughts go to the victims and their families". King Carl XVI Gustaf said that the royal family received the news "with great dismay and sadness".

In the days following the attack, there were reports of people wearing suspicious outfits or brandishing weapons, which were discovered to be people celebrating Halloween. The police warned the public not to carry imitation weapons with their Halloween costumes, to avoid potentially dangerous misunderstandings.

The school remained closed until 2 November, when it reopened with higher security. An Afghan father told The Local that he wished to leave the neighbourhood for his family's safety.

On 29 September 2017, the first book about the school attack was published: Det som aldrig fick ske. The book contains completely new facts, for example a secret suicide note that the police and the Pettersson family did not know existed. In the book the brother of Anton Lundin Pettersson speaks out for the first time.
The author, Åsa Erlandsson, won the Stora Journalistpriset (the finest prize in journalism in Sweden) for the book.

In 2019, the attacker behind the Christchurch mosque shootings at Al Noor Mosque and Linwood Islamic Centre in Christchurch, New Zealand, mentioned Pettersson in his manifesto and declared his support for him.

See also

Homicides in Sweden in 2015
2015 Gothenburg car bombing
2015 Gothenburg pub shooting

Racially motivated homicides in Scandinavia
1991–92 Stockholm shootings
2009–10 Malmö shootings
2011 Norway attacks
2015 IKEA stabbing attack

References

Deaths by stabbing in Sweden
Mass stabbings in Europe
October 2015 events in Europe
October 2015 crimes in Europe
Anti-Muslim violence in Europe
Racism in Sweden
Hate crimes
School massacres
Stabbing attacks in 2015
Trollhättan
2015 murders in Sweden
Stabbing attacks in Sweden